The Mohaka Viaduct is a railway viaduct spanning the Mohaka River in northern Hawke’s Bay, on the East Coast of the North Island of New Zealand, near the small settlement of Raupunga. It was built between 1930 and 1937 by the Public Works Department (PWD) for the New Zealand Railways Department (NZR).

Background
Construction of the railway line from Palmerston North to Gisborne line began in 1872, connecting Palmerston North with Napier in 1891. The northern portion from Napier to Wairoa, and then to Gisborne followed much later, being built between 1912 and 1942.

The section of line between Napier and Wairoa passed through difficult country, requiring heavy earthworks, five tunnels, five high steel viaducts to cross deep gorges, and numerous other bridges. Progress was slow, with portions of the line being progressively opened as sections were completed and handed over to the Railways Department.

After completion of the line from Wairoa to the viaduct site in late 1930, the pre-fabricated steel work was railed from the small port of Waikokopu, about 40 km east of Wairoa.

The Government of the day faced major financial problems following the 1929 stock market crash in the US, and the onset of what would become the Great Depression of the 1930s. To cut costs work was suspended on most of the line, although foundation work continued at the Mohaka viaduct.

Then on 3 February 1931 the Hawke’s Bay earthquake caused an enormous amount of damage to both the line and the associated works. Combined with ongoing financial difficulties, this caused the eventual abandonment of work all along the line, although the Mohaka viaduct foundations were finished before work stopped.

The works lay idle until restarted in 1936, after a change in Government and some degree of recovery from the Depression. Preparatory work on completing the viaduct started in June 1936, and the completed viaduct was formally opened by the Minister of Public Works Bob Semple on 1 July 1937; it was nick-named "Bob Semple's Meccano set". It was built without accidents and ahead of schedule. When catastrophic floods in April 1938 washed away part of the low-level road bridge the viaduct was pressed into temporary service for road traffic, before regular trains were using it.

Design and construction
The viaduct was designed by John Lelliot Cull and William Langston Newnham, both of whom worked in the PWD head office. It is built of mild steel components, which were prefabricated at the Public Works Department Workshops at Mount Maunganui, near Tauranga, shipped to Waikokopu, and railed to the construction site.

The steelwork was erected using a cable-way across the gorge to place the material, with the actual erection taking seven months. All told the viaduct incorporates  of steel, held together by about 450,000 rivets.

Current status
This item of New Zealand's engineering heritage was recognised as part of the Institution of Professional Engineers New Zealand (IPENZ) "Engineering to 1990" project which the institution organised to help celebrate New Zealand's 150th anniversary in 1990. A plaque was unveiled to mark the significance of this railway viaduct as part of the development of the nation.

The viaduct has been registered by the New Zealand Historic Places Trust as a Category 1 historic place (Register no.4418).

Following severe storm damage between Wairoa and Gisborne, and doubts about financial viability of the line, the northern portion of the line from Napier – Gisborne was reviewed as part of KiwiRail's  turn-around plan, and was effectively mothballed north of Wairoa in early 2012. Later, on 2 October 2012 KiwiRail announced the mothballing of the entire line from Napier to Gisborne. Trains began running again in 2019.

Images

References

Citations

Bibliography

External links
Photos of construction 1936–37
John Lelliot Cull bio (IPENZ)
William Langston Newnham bio (IPENZ)
Mohaka Viaduct (IPENZ)
Film showing construction work

Railway bridges in New Zealand
Steel bridges in New Zealand
Rail transport in the Hawke's Bay Region
Buildings and structures in the Hawke's Bay Region
1930s architecture in New Zealand
Bridges in the Hawke's Bay Region
Heritage New Zealand Category 1 historic places in the Hawke's Bay Region
Viaducts in New Zealand